In geology, fault line or faultline refers to the surface trace of a fault.

Fault line may also refer to:

Books
 Fault Line, a 2009 thriller by Barry Eisler
 Fault Lines, a 1989 novel by Stan Leventhal
 Faultlines: Cultural Materialism and the Politics of Dissident Reading, a 1992 book by Alan Sinfield
 Faultlines (Megalogenis book), a 2003 book by George Megalogenis
 Fault Lines: How Hidden Fractures Still Threaten the World Economy, a 2010 book by Indian economist Raghuram Rajan
 Fault Lines, a 2015 book by David Pryce-Jones

Film and television
 Fault Line, a 2009 and upcoming film directed by Lucas Elliot Eberl
 Fault Lines (TV series), a documentary series produced and broadcast by Al Jazeera English

Role-playing games
 Fault Line (adventure), a role-playing game adventure

Music
 Faultline (musician), electronic music project centred on producer David Kosten
 Faultline Records, an independent record label based in Melbourne, Australia

Albums
 Faultline (album), a 1989 album by Birdsongs of the Mesozoic
 Faultlines (album), a 2003 album by Karine Polwart
 Fault Lines (album), a 2012 album by Turboweekend

Songs
 "Faultline", a song by The Haunted from Versus 2008
 "Faultline", a song by Silverchair from Frogstomp
 "Fault Line", a song by 10 Years from The Autumn Effect
 "Fault Line", a song by Jack River from Sugar Mountain
 "Faultlines", a song by Lanterns on the Lake from Beings
 "Faultlines", a song by Suede on their 2013 album Bloodsports
 "Fault Line", a song by August Burns Red from Rescue & Restore
 "Fault Lines", a 2014 song by Tom Petty & the Heartbreakers from Hypnotic Eye
 "Fault Lines", a 2021 song by Amanda Shires from Take It Like a Man

See also
 Crevasse
 Fracture (geology) or crevice